Panicum capillare, known by the common name witchgrass, is a species of grass. It is native plant to most of North America from the East Coast through all of the West Coast and California. It can be  found as an introduced species in Eurasia, and as a weed in gardens and landscaped areas. It grows in many types of habitat.

Description
Panicum capillare is an annual bunchgrass growing decumbent or erect to heights exceeding one meter (3 feet). It is green to blue- or purple-tinged in color. In texture it is quite hairy, especially on the leaves and at the nodes. The ligule is a fringe of long hairs.

The inflorescence is a large open panicle which  may be over half the total length of the plant, up to half a meter long. At maturity it fans out, spreading to a width over 20 centimeters. As the plant dies and dries, the panicle may break off whole and becomes a tumbleweed.

References

External links
USDA Plants Profile for Panicum capillare (witchgrass)
Jepson Manual Treatment
UC CalPhotos gallery of Panicum capillare

capillare
Bunchgrasses of North America
Grasses of Canada
Grasses of Mexico
Grasses of the United States
Native grasses of the Great Plains region
Native grasses of California
Natural history of the California chaparral and woodlands
Native grasses of Oklahoma
Native grasses of Texas
Plants described in 1753
Taxa named by Carl Linnaeus